Leonard Coleman (born January 30, 1962) is a former American football player who played cornerback in the National Football League for the Indianapolis Colts and San Diego Chargers from 1985 to 1989. He played college football at Vanderbilt University and was drafted by the Colts in the first round of the 1984 NFL Draft, the first player drafted by the team following its relocation from Baltimore.

Coleman sat out the 1984 NFL season because of a contract dispute, instead signing a deal with the Memphis Showboats of the United States Football League and completing his degree at Vanderbilt. Early in the 1985 season, however, Coleman joined the Colts after the club bought out his contract with Memphis. He started all 16 games for Indianapolis in 1986, but played in only four games in 1987. Coleman was traded to the Chargers for an undisclosed draft pick on July 9, 1988, playing 16 games in 1988 and one in 1989 before being waived on September 12, 1989.

References

1962 births
Living people
Sportspeople from Boynton Beach, Florida
Players of American football from Florida
American football cornerbacks
Vanderbilt Commodores football players
Indianapolis Colts players
San Diego Chargers players